Monique Wittig (July 13, 1935 – January 3, 2003) was a French author, philosopher and feminist theorist who wrote about abolition of the sex-class system and coined the phrase "heterosexual contract". Her seminal work is titled The Straight Mind and Other Essays. She published her first novel, L'Opoponax, in 1964.  Her second novel, Les Guérillères (1969), was a landmark in lesbian feminism.

Biography
Monique Wittig was born in 1935 in Dannemarie, Haut-Rhin, France. In 1950 she moved to Paris to study at the Sorbonne. In 1964 she published her first novel, L'Opoponax which won her immediate attention in France. After the novel was translated into English, Wittig achieved international recognition. She was one of the founders of the Mouvement de libération des femmes (MLF) (Women's Liberation Movement). In 1969 she published what is arguably her most influential work, Les Guérillères, which is today considered a revolutionary and controversial source for feminist and lesbian thinkers around the world. Its publication is also considered to be the founding event of French feminism.

Wittig earned her PhD from the School for Advanced Studies in the Social Sciences, after completing a thesis titled "Le Chantier littéraire". Wittig was a central figure in lesbian and feminist movements in France. 
In 1971, she was a founding member of the Gouines rouges ("Red Dykes"), the first lesbian group in Paris. She was also involved in the Féministes Révolutionnaires ("Revolutionary feminists"), a radical feminist group. She published various other works, some of which include the 1973 Le Corps lesbien (or The Lesbian Body) and the 1976 Brouillon pour un dictionnaire des amantes (or Lesbian Peoples: Material for a Dictionary), which her partner, Sande Zeig, coauthored.

In 1976 Wittig and Zeig moved to the United States where Wittig focused on producing work of gender theory. Her works, ranging from the philosophical essay The Straight Mind to parables such as Les Tchiches et les Tchouches, explored the interconnectedness and intersection of lesbianism, feminism, and literary form. With various editorial positions both in France and in the United States, Wittig's works became internationally recognized and were commonly published in both French and English. She continued to work as a visiting professor in various universities across the nation, including the University of California, Berkeley, Vassar College and the University of Arizona in Tucson.  She taught a course in materialist thought through Women's Studies programs, wherein her students were immersed in the process of correcting the American translation of The Lesbian Body. She died of a heart attack on January 3, 2003.

Writing style
Wittig had a materialist approach in her works (evident in Les Guérillères).  She also demonstrated a very critical theoretical approach (evident in her essay, "One Is Not Born a Woman").

The Straight Mind
In the first essay of the collection, titled The Category of Sex, Wittig theorizes the class nature of sex oppression, favouring a social constructionist rather than biological essentialist view of the dialect between the sexes.

While Wittig depicted only women in her literature, she abhorred the idea that she was a "women's writer".
Monique Wittig called herself a "radical lesbian."

Moreover, for Wittig, the social or gender category "woman" exists only through its relation to the social category "man," and the "women" without relation to "men" would cease to exist, leaving individuals freed from social constructs and categories dictating behavior or norms. She advocated a strong universalist position, saying that the expression of one's identity and the liberation of desire require the abolition of gender categories.

Wittig identified herself as a radical lesbian. In her work The Straight Mind, she argued that lesbians are not women because to be a lesbian is to step outside of the heterosexual norm of women, as defined by men for men's ends.

Wittig also developed a critical view of Marxism which obstructed feminist struggle, but also of feminism itself which does not question the heterosexual dogma.

A theorist of materialist feminism, she stigmatised the myth of "the woman", called heterosexuality a political regime, and outlined the basis for a social contract which lesbians refuse.

Theoretical views
Wittig's essays call into question some of the basic premises of contemporary feminist theory. Wittig was one of the first feminist theorists to interrogate heterosexuality as not just sexuality, but as a political regime. Defining herself as a radical lesbian, she and other lesbians during the early 1980s in France and Quebec reached a consensus that "radical lesbianism" posits heterosexuality as a political regime that must be overthrown. Wittig criticized contemporary feminism for not questioning this heterosexual political regime and believed that contemporary feminism proposed to rearrange rather than eliminate the system. While a critique of heterosexuality as a "political institution" had been laid by certain lesbian separatists in the United States, American lesbian separatism did not posit heterosexuality as a regime to be overthrown. Rather, the aim was to develop within an essentialist framework new lesbian values within lesbian communities.

Wittig was a theorist of materialist feminism. She believed that it is the historical task of feminists to define oppression in materialist terms. It is necessary to make clear that women are a class, and to recognize the category of "woman" as well as the category of "man" as political and economic categories. Wittig acknowledges that these two social classes exist because of the social relationship between men and women. However, women as a class will disappear when man as a class disappears. Just as there are no slaves without masters, there are no women without men. The category of sex is the political category that founds society as heterosexual. The category of "man" and "woman" exists only in a heterosexual system, and to destroy the heterosexual system will end the categories of men and women.

Linguistics
Wittig states that "Gender is the linguistic index of the political opposition between the sexes." Only one gender exists: the feminine, the masculine not being a gender. The masculine is not the masculine but the general, as the masculine experience is normalized over the experience of the feminine. Feminine is the concrete as denoted through sex in language, whereas only the masculine as general is the abstract. Wittig lauds Djuna Barnes and Marcel Proust for universalizing the feminine by making no gendered difference in the way they describe characters. As taking the point of view of a lesbian, Wittig finds it necessary to suppress genders in the same way Djuna Barnes cancels out genders by making them obsolete.

Les Guérillères
Les Guérillères, published in 1969, five years after Wittig's first novel, revolves around the elles, women warriors who have created their own sovereign state by overthrowing the patriarchal world. The novel is structured through a series of prose poems. "Elles are not 'the women'--a mistranslation that often surfaces in David Le Vay's English rendition--but rather the universal 'they,' a linguistic assault on the masculine collective pronoun ils." The novel initially describes the world that the elles have created and ends with members recounting the days of war that led to the sovereign state.

Bibliography

Novels
  (Winner of the Prix Médicis.)

Plays
  (Unpublished.)
  (Radio Stuttgart.)
  (Radio Stuttgart.)
  (Radio Stuttgart.)
  (Vlasta 4 supplement.)

Short fiction
Most collected in Paris-la-Politique.  Paris: P.O.L., 1999

Translations

Essays and criticisms
Most collected in La Pensée straight, Paris: Balland, 2001 (trans. by the author and Sam Bourcier) and in The Straight Mind and Other Essays, Boston: Beacon Press, 1992

 
 
 
Reprinted as: 
 
 
Reprinted as: 
 
 
 
 
Translation of: 
 
 
Reprinted as: 
 
Reprinted as: 
 
 
 
 
  
 
  Alternative version.
  Alternative version.

See also
 Feminism in France
 Amazones d'Hier, Lesbiennes d'Aujourd'hui
 Double burden
 Economic materialism
 Feminist economics
 Stevi Jackson
 Christine Delphy
 Rosemary Hennessy

References

Further reading

External links

 Monique Wittig Literary Estate
 Monique Wittig Biography at GLBTQ.com
Monique Wittig Papers. General Collection, Beinecke Rare Book and Manuscript Library, Yale University.

1935 births
2003 deaths
20th-century French dramatists and playwrights
20th-century French educators
20th-century French essayists
20th-century French novelists
20th-century French philosophers
20th-century French women writers
20th-century social scientists
20th-century translators
21st-century French dramatists and playwrights
21st-century French educators
21st-century French essayists
21st-century French novelists
21st-century French philosophers
21st-century French women writers
21st-century social scientists
21st-century translators
Continental philosophers
Critical theorists
Critics of Marxism
Feminist philosophers
Feminist studies scholars
French emigrants to the United States
French essayists
French feminist writers
French lesbian writers
French social commentators
French sociologists
French translators
French women dramatists and playwrights
French women non-fiction writers
French women novelists
French women philosophers
French women short story writers
Lesbian academics
Lesbian feminists
French LGBT rights activists
Literacy and society theorists
Literary theorists
Materialist feminists
Materialists
People from Haut-Rhin
Philosophers of art
Philosophers of culture
Philosophers of economics
Philosophers of education
Philosophers of history
Philosophers of identity
Philosophers of language
Philosophers of linguistics
Philosophers of literature
Philosophers of love
Philosophers of sexuality
Philosophers of social science
Philosophy writers
Political philosophers
Postmodern feminists
Postmodern writers
Prix Médicis winners
Queer theorists
Radical feminists
School for Advanced Studies in the Social Sciences alumni
Social philosophers
Surrealist writers
Theorists on Western civilization
Trope theorists
University of Arizona faculty
University of California, Berkeley faculty
Vassar College faculty
Writers about activism and social change
Writers about globalization
Signatories of the 1971 Manifesto of the 343